ICGV Týr is an  and the former flagship of the Icelandic Coast Guard. The ship was built by Dannebrog Værft in Denmark in 1974–1975 and entered service in 1975. Týr is the second largest ship in the Icelandic Coast Guard and participated in the Third Cod War. The ship conducted patrols, search and rescue, fishery inspections, general law enforcement and counter-terrorism operations in the Icelandic exclusive economic zone and the waters of the surrounding territories, such as Greenland and Jan Mayen. Týr was decommissioned in 2021 and sold in 2022.

Description
The vessels have a 20-ton bollard-pulling winch and passive rolling tanks. 

The Ægir class was initially armed with a  Hotchkiss cannon. However, these weapons were replaced in 1990 with the Bofors /L60 autocannon, which in turn was replaced with the 40 mm Bofors L70 in the late 2000s. Other weapons include net cutters, which the Icelandic Coast Guard (ICG) used during the Cod Wars. A large crane is situated forward of the helicopter deck. The ships of the class are equipped with Sperry surface search and navigational radar. Týr is equipped with hull-mounted sonar. The ship sports a helicopter deck aft and a hangar located between the funnels. In 1997, the helicopter deck was extended. The ship has a complement of 19.

Construction and career
The patrol vessel was ordered for construction by Dannebrog Værft of Denmark and launched on 10 October 1974. The vessel, named for the deity of Norse mythology, was commissioned in the ICG on 15 March 1975. Týr primarily conducts patrols, search and rescue, fishery inspections, general law enforcement and counter-terrorism operations in the Icelandic exclusive economic zone (EEZ).

Cod Wars
ICG vessels were deployed to chase unlicensed fishing trawlers out of the new limit. On 21 November Týr began cutting the nets of British trawlers. ICG had armed all of its trawlers with net cutters. If a fishing trawler refused to leave the area, the ICG ships would come up astern of the fishing trawler at a right angle and using the net cutter, cut the fishing vessel's nets. The loss of the nets and the catch within was an expensive proposition for the fishermen, so they began to work together to prevent the ICG vessels from cutting their nets. Some of the fishing trawlers tried to prevent the ICG from cutting their nets by ramming the ICG ships. The British Royal Navy sent tugboats and frigates to assist the British trawlers in the region. This led to a series of confrontations between the ICG and the Royal Navy.

After a quiet period around Christmas, on 28 December 1975, Týr rammed , which was escorting two fishing trawlers at the time. On 6 February 1976 Týr collided with  after the British frigate intervened while the Icelandic patrol vessel was attempting to cut the nets of the trawler Ross Altair. The ship received serious damage in the incident. The Third Cod War ended on 1 June after an agreement was reached between Iceland and the United Kingdom.

Later career

In January 1980, the third engineer on Týr, stabbed and killed two of his crewmates before throwing himself overboard when the ship was located  miles northeast of Grímsey.

In 1994, a crane was fitted in Týr forward of the helicopter deck on the starboard side. In 1997, the ship underwent a refit that extended its helicopter deck and installed a radome atop the ship. In 2006, Týr underwent a refit in Poland that improved the bridge and accommodations along with the installation of in-flight refuelling equipment for the helicopters.

In March 2014, Týr was leased to Fáfnir Offshore hf. for surveillance and rescue work as well as general law enforcement and service work for the Sheriff of Svalbard with home port in Longerbyen.

The Icelandic Coast Guard fleet takes part in Frontex operations. On 4 April, the crew of Týr rescued 320 people from a boat of the coast of Libya. During the days of 3 and 4 May, the crew rescued 328 people from two small boats north of Libya.

On 11 June 2015, Týr was accidentally rammed and damaged by the Russian sailing ship  at Reykjavík.

Týr finished its last tour of duty on 15 November 2021 and was put up for a sale.

Notable appearances in media
Týr was featured in the 2010 drama film Undercurrent along with the rescue helicopter TF-LÍF.

Citations

References

External links 
 in Icelandic and in English

Ægir-class offshore patrol vessels
Ships built in Denmark
1974 ships
Patrol vessels of Iceland